Robert E. Fassnacht  (January 14, 1937 – August 24, 1970) was an American physics post-doctoral researcher who was killed by the August 1970 bombing of Sterling Hall on the University of Wisconsin–Madison campus, perpetrated as a protest against the Vietnam War.

Fassnacht was a student from South Bend, Indiana, who received a Westinghouse scholarship to attend college. He was at the University of Wisconsin–Madison pursuing post-doctoral research in the field of superconductivity.

Bombing
On the night of August 23 and into the early morning hours of August 24, 1970, Fassnacht was in the lab taking care of unfinished work because he and his family were slated to leave for a vacation in San Diego, California. His lab was located in the basement of Sterling Hall. He was in the process of cooling down his dewar with liquid nitrogen when the explosion occurred. Rescuers found him face down in about a foot of water. The cause of death, determined from the autopsy, was internal trauma.

As a protest against the Vietnam War, the bomb was built and planted by Karleton "Karl" Armstrong, Dwight Armstrong, David Fine, and Leo Burt. The intention was to destroy the Army Mathematics Research Center, but instead destroyed much of the physics department and severely damaged neighboring buildings.

After the bombing

Family
Fassnacht was survived by his wife, Stephanie, and their three children, a three-year-old son, Christopher, and twin daughters, Heidi and Karin who turned one a month after their father's death. The family continued to live in Madison in relative quiet and anonymity for many decades after the explosion, often crossing paths with the site of their father/husband's murder.

Stephanie Fassnacht completed a long career at the University of Wisconsin–Madison, occupying an office just blocks from the site of her husband's death. She stated that she harbored "no ill will" toward Karl Armstrong "and never did." Instead she held the Board of Regents responsible. Christopher attended Harvard University and Caltech and is now a physics professor at the University of California at Davis. Heidi and Karin both graduated from the University of Wisconsin–Madison.

Commemorative plaque

On May 18, 2007, the University of Wisconsin–Madison unveiled a plaque on the side of Sterling Hall commemorating the bombing and Robert Fassnacht's death.  The event was attended by John D. Wiley, then Chancellor of the University of Wisconsin–Madison and an acquaintance of Robert Fassnacht, by current and former members of the Physics department, including chair Susan Coppersmith, and family and friends of Robert, including his daughters Heidi and Karin.

The plaque reads:This is the site of the Sterling Hall Bombing, which occurred at 3:40 AM on August 24, 1970.  An outstanding research scientist, Dr. Robert Fassnacht, was killed in the bombing while working in his laboratory on a physics experiment studying a basic mechanism for superconductivity in metals.  Three others were injured.  Dr. Fassnacht was 33 years old, married, and had three young children.

Bibliography

References

Books and Resources
Rads: The 1970 Bombing of the Army Math Research Center at the University of Wisconsin–Madison and Its Aftermath, 1992, by Tom Bates
The Madison Bombings, 1988, by Michael Morris
Madison Newspapers Archive of the Sterling Hall Bombing

American terrorism victims
Opposition to United States involvement in the Vietnam War
Kalamazoo College alumni
University of Wisconsin–Madison alumni
1937 births
1970 deaths
People murdered in Wisconsin
People from South Bend, Indiana
Deaths by improvised explosive device in the United States